Max Payne is a neo-noir third-person shooter video game series developed by Remedy Entertainment (Max Payne and Max Payne 2) and Rockstar Studios (Max Payne 3). The series is named after its protagonist, Max Payne, a New York City police detective turned vigilante after his family was murdered by drug addicts. The series' first and second installments were written by Sam Lake, while Max Payne 3 was primarily written by Rockstar Games' Dan Houser.

The first game of the series, Max Payne, was released in 2001 for Microsoft Windows and in 2002 for PlayStation 2, Xbox, and Apple Macintosh; a different version of the game was released for the Game Boy Advance in 2003. A sequel entitled Max Payne 2: The Fall of Max Payne was released in 2003 for PlayStation 2, Xbox and Microsoft Windows. In 2008, a movie adaption, loosely based on the original game, entitled Max Payne, was released, starring Mark Wahlberg and Mila Kunis in the roles of Max Payne and Mona Sax, respectively. Max Payne 3 was developed by Rockstar Studios and released on May 15, 2012 for PlayStation 3 and Xbox 360, and on June 1, 2012 for Microsoft Windows. 

On November 15, 2021, Microsoft announced that in celebration of 20 years of Xbox, they would be adding over 70 more games to their backwards compatibility program. Headlining these games was the Max Payne trilogy, making the games available to play on Microsoft's Xbox One and Xbox Series X/S consoles.

The franchise is notable for its use of "bullet time" in action sequences, as well as being positively received by critics, although Max Payne 2s sales were considered underwhelming. , the Max Payne franchise has sold over 7.5 million copies. The film rendition received negative reviews but was commercially successful.

On April 6, 2022, Remedy announced that a remake of Max Payne and Max Payne 2 is in development, in a development agreement with Rockstar Games. The two games will be released as a single title.

Games

Max Payne

Renegade DEA agent and former NYPD officer Max Payne attempts to hunt down the ones responsible for murdering his wife and child, as well as framing him for the murder of his NYPD partner, Alex Balder. As the story unfolds, he gains a number of "allies", including Vladimir Lem (a suave, old-fashioned Russian mobster) and Mona Sax (a vigilante who is out to avenge the death of her twin sister) and uncovers a major conspiracy involving the trafficking of a narcotic called V, or Valkyr—after the mythological figures in Norse mythology—which is somehow connected to the death of Max's family.

Max Payne 2: The Fall of Max Payne

Two years after the first game, Max Payne has rejoined the NYPD and has been cleared of the charges for his killing spree thanks to his connection to Senator Alfred Woden, the leader of a secret society called the Inner Circle. During a routine murder investigation, Max finds himself face-to-face with the fugitive Mona Sax, who reluctantly joins him in his investigation. As the two work together to uncover the truth, they begin to develop feelings for each other, and come across another major conspiracy, which this time involves Vladmir Lem, the Italian Mob, and the Inner Circle.

Max Payne 3

Nine years after the second game, Max Payne has left New York and is working on a private security detail in São Paulo, Brazil. When the wife of his employer is kidnapped by a local street gang, Max and his old friend Raul Passos join forces in an attempt to rescue her, igniting a war that will lead them to confront a larger conspiracy.

Additional titles
Remedy, with funding from Rockstar who holds the rights to the series, announced plans to remake Max Payne and Max Payne 2 for personal computers, PlayStation 5, and Xbox Series X and Series S in April 2022. At the time of the announcement, the remakes were at an early development state, and no planned release date was announced. It was confirmed that the two games will be released as a single title.

Film adaptation

Early in 2003, it was confirmed that 20th Century Fox had bought the rights to adapt the game to film. The Max Payne movie went into production in 2008 and was directed by John Moore. The movie was produced by Collision Entertainment and Firm Films in Toronto, Ontario, Canada. Mark Wahlberg and Mila Kunis play the roles of Max Payne and Mona Sax respectively. Beau Bridges, Chris O'Donnell, Nelly Furtado and Ludacris have roles as B.B. Hensley, Jason Colvin, Christa Balder and Jim Bravura respectively. On July 10, 2008, a teaser trailer was released, featuring an instrumental version of the Marilyn Manson song, "If I Was Your Vampire". The film was released to theaters in the U.S. on October 17, 2008 with a PG-13 rating. While it was ranked first on its opening weekend, grossing US$18 million at the box office, the film received mainly negative reviews, having a 16% rating at Rotten Tomatoes, based on 129 reviews. In June 2022, 20th Century Studios announced that a Max Payne reboot movie is in development.

Characters
Note: A gray cell indicates that the character does not appear in that medium.

References

External links

 
 Max Payne franchises at MobyGames
 The History of Max Payne, The Escapist, May 12, 2012
Celebrate 20 years of Xbox with over 70 new Backward Compatible Games, Xbox Wire, November 15, 2021

 
Rockstar Games franchises
Take-Two Interactive franchises
Video game franchises
Video game franchises introduced in 2001